YMCA Philadelphia, also Greater Philadelphia YMCA was founded on June 15, 1854, by George H. Stuart, a prominent Philadelphia businessman and importer. The goal of the Association was to reach "the many thousands of neglected youth not likely to be brought under any moral influence by any other means."

The Greater Philadelphia YMCA is a community service organization that promotes positive values through programs that help to build strong kids, strong families and strong communities. Over the years, Philadelphia Freedom Valley YMCA has grown to include 15 branches and 55 program sites throughout the Greater Philadelphia area.

Branches

Abington

CLOSED - Abington YMCA, serving Abington, Jenkintown, Cheltenham, Willow Grove and the surrounding communities, offers a wide range of programs for children and teens including swim lessons, sports, fitness, child care and day camps. For adults and seniors, YMCA has personal training, a variety of group exercise classes, wellness orientations and free babysitting services.

Ambler
Ambler Area YMCA, serving Ambler, Fort Washington, Blue Bell, Horsham, North Wales and the surrounding communities, offers a wide range of programs for children and teens including swim lessons, sports, fitness, karate and day camps. For adults and seniors, YMCA has personal training, a variety of group exercise classes, water aerobics and free babysitting services.

Audubon
Audubon YMCA, serving West and East Norriton, Blue Bell, King of Prussia, Norristown and the surrounding communities, offers a wide range of programs for children and teens including swim lessons, sports, fitness, child care and day camps. For adults and seniors, YMCA has personal training, a variety of group exercise classes, wellness orientations and free babysitting services.

Christian Street
Christian Street YMCA, serving South Philadelphia, Center City and the surrounding communities, offers a wide range of programs for children and teens including swim lessons, sports, fitness, child care and day camps. For adults and seniors, YMCA has personal training, a variety of group exercise classes, wellness orientations and free babysitting services. It is located within the Christian Street Historic District.

Columbia North
Columbia North YMCA, serving North Philadelphia, Fairmount, Kensington, Port Richmond and the surrounding communities, offers a wide range of programs for children and teens including swim lessons, sports, fitness, child care and day camps. For adults and seniors, YMCA has personal training, a variety of group exercise classes, wellness orientations and free babysitting services.

Hatboro
CLOSED - Hatboro Area YMCA, serving Hatboro, Horsham, Warminster, Willow Grove and the surrounding communities, offers a wide range of programs for children and teens including swim lessons, sports, fitness, gymnastics and day camps. For adults and seniors, YMCA has personal training, a variety of group exercise classes, wellness orientations and free babysitting services.

Haverford 
Haverford YMCA, serving Havertown and the surrounding Main Line communities of Bryn Mawr, Villanova, Ardmore and Haverford, offers a wide range of programs for children and teens including swim lessons, sports, fitness, child care and day camps. For adults and seniors, YMCA has personal training, a variety of group exercise classes, wellness orientations and free babysitting services.

Northeast
Northeast Family YMCA, serving Northeast Philadelphia, Somerton, Bustleton, Normandy and the surrounding communities, offers a wide range of programs for children and teens including swim lessons, sports, fitness, child care and day camps. For adults and seniors, YMCA has personal training, a variety of group exercise classes, wellness orientations and free babysitting services.

Phoenixville
Phoenixville YMCA, serving Phoenixville, Valley Forge, King of Prussia, Malvern, Audubon, Spring City, Royersford, Collegville and Kimberton, offering a wide range of programs for children and teens including swim lessons, sports, fitness, child care and day camps. For adults and seniors, YMCA has personal training, a variety of group exercise classes, wellness orientations and free babysitting services.

Pottstown
Pottstown YMCA, serving Pottstown, Norristown, Broomall and Reading, offers a wide range of programs for children and teens including swim lessons, sports, fitness, child care and day camps. For adults and seniors, YMCA has personal training, a variety of group exercise classes, wellness orientations and free babysitting services.

Rocky Run
Rocky Run YMCA, serving Media, Aston, Newtown Square, Edgemont, Springfield and the surrounding communities, offers a wide range of programs for children and teens including swim lessons, sports, fitness, child care and day camps. For adults and seniors, YMCA has personal training, a variety of group exercise classes, wellness orientations and free babysitting services.

Roxborough
Roxborough YMCA, serving Roxborough, Manayunk, Lafayette Hill, Chestnut Hill and the surrounding communities, offers a wide range of programs for children and teens including swim lessons, sports, fitness, child care and day camps. For adults and seniors, YMCA has personal training, a variety of group exercise classes, wellness orientations and free babysitting services.

Spring Valley
Spring Valley YMCA, serving Limerick, Pottstown, Harleysville, Lansdale, Skippack, Collegeville and the surrounding communities, offers a wide range of programs for children and teens including swim lessons, sports, fitness, child care and day camps. For adults and seniors, YMCA has personal training, a variety of group exercise classes, wellness orientations and free babysitting services.

Upper Perkiomen
Upper Perkiomen YMCA, serving Pennsburg, Doylestown, Allentown, Quakertown and the surrounding communities, offers a wide range of programs for children and teens including swim lessons, sports, fitness, child care and day camps. For adults and seniors, YMCA has personal training, a variety of group exercise classes, wellness orientations and free babysitting services.

West Philadelphia
West Philadelphia YMCA, serving West Philadelphia, Wynnefield, Elmwood and the surrounding communities, offers a wide range of programs for children and teens including swim lessons, sports, fitness, child care and day camps. For adults and seniors, YMCA has personal training, a variety of group exercise classes, wellness orientations and free babysitting services.

Historic building
YMCA's Armed Forces Building, also known as YMCA and Navy Central YMCA Annex, built 1926 to 1928, was listed on the National Register of Historic Places in 1980. It has been converted into luxury apartments

References

External links

Historic building
nationalregisterofhistoricplaces.com
Y.M.C.A. Armed Forces Building at Philadelphia Architects and Buildings

Residential buildings on the National Register of Historic Places in Philadelphia
Philadelphia
Clubhouses in Pennsylvania
Art Deco architecture in Pennsylvania
1854 establishments in Pennsylvania
Center City, Philadelphia
Buildings and structures completed in 1928